The Kaduwela Municipal Council is the local council for Kaduwela, in Colombo District, Sri Lanka.It wields first place in terms of size, with an area of 87.71 square kilometres including the reservoirs, water courses and bodies. It is 13.4% of the area of Colombo District. By the end of the year 2016, the total population of the area was reported as 260,341.

Wards

Demographics

In 2016, the population numbered 260,341 and the council had 184,026 electors registered.

Ethnic Groups

Religion

Representation 

The Kaduwela Municipal Council is represented by 48 councillors, elected using an open list proportional representation system.

2018 Local government election 

Results of the 2018 Sri Lankan local elections held on 10 February 2018.

2011 Local government election 

Results of the 2011 Sri Lankan local elections held on 17 & 23 July & 10 August 2011

References

Local authorities in Western Province, Sri Lanka
Municipal councils of Sri Lanka